The triangle keelback (Xenochrophis trianguligerus) is a species of snake found in Brunei Darussalam, Burma (Myanmar), Cambodia, India (Nicobar Islands; Arunachal Pradesh (Deban - Changlang district)), Indonesia (Nias, Mentawai, Sumatra, Laos, Malaysia (Malaya and East Malaysia), Singapore, Thailand, and Vietnam.

The type locality is Java.

Gallery

References

 Friedrich Boie 1827 Bemerkungen über Merrem's Versuch eines Systems der Amphibien, 1. Lieferung: Ophidier. Isis van Oken, Jena, 20: 508–566.

Xenochrophis
Reptiles described in 1827
Taxa named by Friedrich Boie
Reptiles of Cambodia
Reptiles of Myanmar